Carrickmines is an outer suburb of Dublin in Dún Laoghaire–Rathdown, Ireland. The area, still semi-rural, was historically on the border of English control and featured a defensive construction, Carrickmines Castle, which became the subject of national controversy during the building of a late stage of Dublin's M50 orbital motorway.

Character
Previously a rural area, and today a semi-rural suburban region, Carrickmines is now divided northeast–southwest by the M50 motorway, with, to the northeast, more established residential areas, and to the southwest, including along Glenamuck Road, new retail parks, office buildings, housing schemes and apartments.

Geography
Carrickmines developed as a settlement in the more than 6 km long valley of the same name, which contains the modest Carrickmines River and its tributaries. The Ballyogan, Glenamuck and Golf Streams all merge in the vicinity. Downstream at Brennanstown, the river merges with St. Bride's Stream, from Foxrock, to form the Loughlinstown River, which in turn meets the Bride's Glen Stream to form the Shanganagh River, which reaches the sea at Killiney Strand.

Leopardstown lies to the northwest, Foxrock to the north, Cabinteely to the northeast and Brennanstown to the east, Ballyogan to the west, Glenamuck to the south, and Laughanstown and Lehaunstown to the southeast.

History

Carrickminders

During the construction of the M50 motorway, Carrickmines gained national notoriety when anti-roads protesters calling themselves the Carrickminders set up camp in the area and delayed the completion of the M50 for two years with legal challenges being taken by Vincent Salafia. The objectors claimed that the underground remains of Carrickmines Castle, an Anglo-Norman fort built in the 12th century on the edge of the Pale, was of national importance. Today, much of the uncovered remains are preserved in tunnels and other structures scattered around the interchange. Dún Laoghaire–Rathdown County Council claimed the action greatly increased the cost of the project, which was eventually completed in August 2005.

Development
Junction 15 of the M50 lies at the centre of Carrickmines. The retail park and developments on Glenamuck Road have converted the previously semi-rural area into a mix of suburban complexes, with shops, offices, apartment blocks and housing estates, and a patchwork of remaining farmland.

Retail park
The retail park at Carrickmines, The Park Carrickmines, contains a mixture of retail and office space. It was sold for €100m in 2006, and reportedly garnered the highest retail park rents in Ireland in 2014. In 2015 it was reported as the best performing Irish retail park by The Sunday Times.

2015 fire

On 10 October 2015, a large fire swept through a halting site on Glenamuck Road.

Transport
Carrickmines Luas stop on the Green Line lies in the northeast of the settlement and has a park and ride. It is also served by regular Go-Ahead Ireland 63 and 63A services which pass through Carrickmines on their route from Dún Laoghaire to Kilternan.

Carrickmines railway station originally lay on the Dublin and South Eastern Railway's Harcourt Street line. It opened on 10 July 1854, but finally closed on 1 January 1959.

Cultural references
Carrickmines is mentioned in James Joyce's novel A Portrait of the Artist as a Young Man, in which it is described as an area dominated by fields. It also appears in the 1961 film Johnny Nobody.

See also
List of towns and villages in Ireland

References

Dún Laoghaire
Towns and villages in Dún Laoghaire–Rathdown